Aa colombiana is a species of orchid in the genus Aa. It is found in Colombia and Ecuador at altitudes of 2900 to 4300 meters.

References

colombiana
Plants described in 1920
Flora of Colombia
Flora of Ecuador